Karsta Frances Lowe (born February 2, 1993) is an American volleyball player who was a First Team All-American at University of California, Los Angeles (UCLA) and, as a member of the United States women's national volleyball team, won the gold medal at the 2015 FIVB World Grand Prix and was honored as the Most Valuable Player and the bronze medal at the 2015 World Cup and the 2016 Rio Olympics.  She has played professionally in Puerto Rico, Italy and China.

Career

College
She played college women's volleyball at UCLA. During her career at UCLA she made the First Team All-American.

International

Lowe was a member of the United States women's national volleyball team which won the gold medal at the 2015 FIVB World Grand Prix and she was awarded Most Valuable Player and the bronze medal at the 2015 World Cup and at the 2016 Rio Summer Olympics.

By 2019, she played for Imoco Volley in Italy. After the 2016 Summer Olympics, she went back to school, earning a partial masters in Landscape Architecture from University of Southern California. In February-March 2021, she participated in the inaugural season of Athletes Unlimited, a professional volleyball league in the United States. She finished 5th among all scorers with 3,566 total points. 

Lowe has played with Japanese club JT Marvelous since the 2022–23 season.

References

External links
USA Volleyball Profile
UCLA Profile

1993 births
Living people
American women's volleyball players
UCLA Bruins women's volleyball players
Opposite hitters
Volleyball players at the 2016 Summer Olympics
Olympic bronze medalists for the United States in volleyball
Medalists at the 2016 Summer Olympics
Expatriate volleyball players in China
Expatriate volleyball players in Italy
Expatriate volleyball players in Japan
American expatriate sportspeople in China
American expatriate sportspeople in Italy
American expatriate sportspeople in Japan
Volleyball players from San Diego